Thio Shen Yi SC is a Singaporean lawyer who is a partner of the TSMP Law Corporation, alongside his mother Thio Su Mien and wife Stefanie Yuen-Thio.

Education 
Thio completed an undergraduate law degree at the University of Cambridge in 1991, and was subsequently awarded first prize in the Council for Legal Bar Examination in 1992, topping his cohort for the UK Bar Examinations.

Career 
Thio was one of the founding members of TSMP Law Corporation, which was named after his mother Thio Su Mien. He and his wife Stefanie Yuen-Thio are its joint-managing partners.

Thio was appointed Senior Counsel of the Supreme Court of Singapore in 2008.

From 2015 to 2016, Thio was president of the Law Society of Singapore.In 2016, Thio advocated for accused persons to be given earlier access to legal counsel, pointing out that Singapore's criminal justice system was "an outlier" that placed emphasis on "efficacy of investigations over protection of suspects". This topic received public attention when a 14-year-old boy committed suicide after having been brought in for questioning by police; Thio commented on the incident in the Law Society's newsletter Law Gazette, pointing out that as a vulnerable suspect, the child was not accompanied by a "parent, guardian or lawyer" during the police interview. Law and Home Affairs Minister K. Shanmugam responded to the piece in parliament, criticising it for implying that "police intimidation" had caused the death; Thio issued a clarification that this had not been his intention. Other issues Thio addressed during his tenure include the expansion of legal aid schemes to cover a wider range of criminal offenses and provide pro bono legal assistance to more applicants, as well as managing a glut of law graduates flooding the job market.

In 2021, Thio included in lifestyle magazine Tatler's list of 59 "Asia's Most Influential SG" in the Public Service & Law category.

, Thio is an independent director of Keppel Infrastructure Trust. Thio was awarded the SAL Merit Award in 2022. He is also a specialist mediator in the Singapore International Mediation Centre.

Personal life 
Thio is married to Stefanie Yuen-Thio, who is joint-managing partner of TSMP Law Corporation. Thio is the brother of Thio Li-Ann, a professor at the NUS Faculty of Law. Thio's mother is Thio Su Mien, a former dean of the NUS Faculty of Law. Thio's father is Olympian Thio Gim Hock.

In 2022, it was reported that Thio was one of the victims of a large-scale "nickel scam" in which he had invested $87,000.

References 

20th-century Singaporean lawyers
Alumni of the University of Cambridge

Living people
Year of birth missing (living people)
21st-century Singaporean lawyers